The CAP-CRM Prize in Theoretical and Mathematical Physics is an annual prize awarded by the Canadian Association of Physicists (CAP) and Centre de Recherches Mathématiques (CRM) to recognize research excellence in the fields of theoretical and mathematical physics. The award winner's research should have been performed in Canada or in affiliation with a Canadian organization.

Previous winners
A list of previous winners can be found at the CAP website.

See also

 List of physics awards

References

Physics awards
Awards established in 1995
Canadian science and technology awards